The Nature of Order: An Essay on the Art of Building and the Nature of the Universe is a four-volume work by the architect Christopher Alexander published in 2002–2004.  In his earlier work, Alexander attempted to formulate the principles that lead to a good built environment as patterns, or recurring design solutions. However, he came to believe that patterns themselves are not enough to generate life in buildings and cities, and that one needs a "morphogenetic" understanding of the formation of the built environment as well as a deep understanding of how the makers get in touch with the creative process.

The Phenomenon of Life
Volume 1 attempts to define "life" in the built environment and determine why one built environment may have more life than another. Important to this idea is his notion of centers:

"Centers are those particular identified sets, or systems, which appear within the larger whole as distinct and noticeable parts. They appear because they have noticeable distinctness, which makes them separate out from their surroundings and makes them cohere, and it is from the arrangements of these coherent parts that other coherent parts appear. The life or intensity of one center is increased or decreased according to the position and intensity of other nearby centers. Above all, centers become most intense when the centers which they are made of help each other."

Alexander argues that any entity (center) for example an ecosystem, landscape, garden, city, street, building, window, painting, animal or human being has a certain degree of life. According to Alexander, a human being is able to sense this degree of life in an entity objectively, as a real empirical dimension. He tries to demonstrate this to the reader with experiments that he has conducted, studies and experiments the reader can do. The ability to be aware of the degree of life of an entity, lays out the foundation for his theory and for the creative process of which human beings are, according to Alexander, capable.

The first volume contains an exposition of what the author calls the fundamental properties, which are those that are possessed by environments which have more life. He argues that processes that lead to a good built environment are those that tend to increase one or more of these properties. He identifies fifteen geometric properties which tend to accompany the presence of life in nature, and also in the buildings and cities we make. These properties are seen over and over in nature, and in cities and streets of the past, but have all but disappeared in the developments and buildings of the last one hundred years. The book shows that living structure depends on features which make a close connection with the human self, and that living structure has the capacity to support human well-being.

The Process of Creating Life
The second book describes the process of creating "life", which is an evolutionary process.  Complex systems do not spring into existence fully formed, but rather through a series of small, incremental changes.  The process begins with a simple system and incrementally changes that system such that each change preserves the structure of the previous step. Alexander calls these increments "structure-preserving transformations," and they are essential to his process.

Where book one introduces the reader to 15 geometric properties that make up living systems, Alexander reframes those geometric properties as structure-preserving transformations in and of themselves rather than being the results of other transformations.  For example, Alexander claims that "Levels of Scale" will arise naturally as a result of structure-preserving transformations, but he notes that "Levels of Scale" can also be viewed as a transformation that introduces level of scale into a given structure. A skilled designer would use this transformation to add depth to a particular part of the system that was being built.

Alexander contrasts structure-preserving transformations with "Structure-destroying transformations", which he feels are common in modern architecture.  Alexander himself does express some sympathy for those who have used these processes to design buildings that he feels are devoid of "life": 
"I do not, directly, blame all the architects who have made these buildings in so many places on earth. I believe it is inappropriate to feel anger towards them... Rather, I believe that we must acknowledge that the architects (often our own colleagues) who drew these buildings, and then had them built by methods and processes far from their control, deserve our sympathy for being placed in an impossible position.  What has caused the new tradition of structure-destroying forms of this era, are mainly the machine-like processes of planning, conceiving, budgeting, developing, construction contracting, construction labor, and so forth. The architects who fully accepted the modern machine have hardly been more than pawns in the game which is much larger than they are."

A Vision of a Living World
Volume 3, the last of the four books to be published, is the least theoretical of the books and the most compelling from a practical point of view. In Book 3 Alexander presents hundreds of his own buildings and those of his contemporaries who have used similar methods consistent with the theory of living process. The projects include neighborhoods, housing built by people for themselves, public buildings, public urban space, ornament, colors, and details of construction innovation. Hundreds of color photographs offer concrete examples of the kind of spaces, things and buildings you can achieve when you put Alexander's theories into practice.

These photos of buildings, and the discussion of each, demonstrate exactly what Alexander means when he talks about living structure, and using life-creating processes to create beautiful places and buildings. These places are more than just pleasant to look at, and be in - they reach an archetypal level of human experience, reaching across centuries, across continents, across cultures, across technology, across building materials and climates. They connect to us all. They connect us to our own feelings.

All four books of The Nature of Order present a new framework for perceiving and interacting with our world, a methodology for creating beautiful spaces, a cosmology where art, architecture, science, religion and secular life all work comfortably together. The third book shows us—visually, technically, and artistically—what a world built in this cosmology and framework is likely to be like for us. Six hundred pages of projects built and planned over a thirty-year period, including many un-built experiments, illustrate the impact which is likely to follow from the use of living process in the world. The book provides the reader with an intuitive feel for the kind of world, its style and geometry, which is likely to follow, together with its ecological and natural character. It closes with an assessment of the archetypal character such a new, living world, is likely to reveal.

With these examples, lay people, architects, builders, scientists, artists, and students are able to make this new framework real for themselves, for their own lives, and for their own work. Alexander gives us a feast for the eyes, the mind, and the heart.

The Luminous Ground
The foundations of modern scientific thought, four centuries old, are firmly rooted in a conception that the universe is a machinelike entity, a play of baubles, machines, trinkets. To this day, our real daily experience of ourselves has no clear place in science. It is little wonder that a machinelike world-view has supported the deadly architecture of the last century.

This mechanistic thinking and the consequent investment-oriented tracts of houses, condominiums and offices have dehumanized our cities and our lives. How are spirit, soul, emotion, feeling to be introduced into a building, or a street, or a development project, in modern times? In this process, he approached religious questions from a scientific and philosophical rather than mystical direction, focusing in human feelings, well-being and nature interaction rather than metaphysics.

The Luminous Ground, the fourth book of The Nature of Order, contains what is, perhaps, the deepest revelation in the four-volume work. Alexander addresses the cosmological implications of the theory he has presented. The book begins with a critique of current cosmological thinking, and its separation from personal feeling and value. The outline of a theory in which matter itself is more spirit-like, more personal in character, is sketched. Here is a geometrical view of space and matter seamlessly connected to our own private, personal, experience as sentient and knowing creatures. This is not merely an emotional appendix to the scientific theory of the other books. It is at the core of the entire work, and is rooted in the fact that our two sides - our analytical thinking selves, and our vulnerable emotional personalities as human beings - are coterminous, and must be harnessed at one and the same time, if we are ever to really make sense of what is around us, and be able to create a living world.

Alexander breaks away completely from the one-sided mechanical model of buildings or neighborhoods as mere assemblages of technically generated, interchangeable parts. He shows us conclusively that a spiritual, emotional, and personal basis must underlie every act of building or making. And then, in the middle of the book, comes the linchpin of the work - a one-hundred-page chapter on color, which dramatically conveys the way that consciousness and spirit are manifested in the world.

This is a new cosmology: consciousness inextricably joined to the substrate of matter, present in all matter. This view, though radical, conforms to our most ordinary, daily intuitions. It may provide a path for those contemporary scientists who are beginning to see consciousness as the underpinning of all matter, and thus as a proper object of scientific study. And it will change, forever, our conception of what buildings are.

See also
 Mathematics and architecture
 Consilience

References

External links
 
 The Fifteen Properties Are the Glue which Binds Wholeness Together
 Overview of The Nature of Order

2002 non-fiction books
2003 non-fiction books
2004 non-fiction books
Architecture books